Mair Jones is a former Welsh international lawn and indoor bowler.

In 1985 Jones won a triples bronze medal at the 1985 World Outdoor Bowls Championship in Preston, Victoria, Melbourne, Australia with Rita Jones and Linda Parker.

Jones played for the Welsh International team for 17 years and was a National Champion in 1962.

References

Living people
Welsh female bowls players
Year of birth missing (living people)